In logic, equivocation ("calling two different things by the same name") is an informal fallacy resulting from the use of a particular word/expression in multiple senses within an argument.

It is a type of ambiguity that stems from a phrase having two or more distinct meanings, not from the grammar or structure of the sentence.

Fallacy of four terms

Equivocation in a syllogism (a chain of reasoning) produces a fallacy of four terms. Below are some examples:

 Since only man [human] is rational.
 And no woman is a man [male].
 Therefore, no woman is rational.

The first instance of "man" implies the entire human species, while the second implies just those who are male.

 A feather is light [not heavy].
 What is light [bright] cannot be dark.
 Therefore, a feather cannot be dark.

In the above example, distinct meanings of the word "light" are implied in contexts of the first and second statements.

 All jackasses [male donkey] have long ears.
 Carl is a jackass [annoying person].
 Therefore, Carl has long ears.

Here, the equivocation is the metaphorical use of "jackass" to imply a simple-minded or obnoxious person instead of a male donkey.

Motte-and-bailey fallacy

Equivocation can also be used to conflate two positions which share similarities, one modest and easy to defend and one much more controversial. The arguer advances the controversial position, but when challenged, they insist that they are only advancing the more modest position.

See also

 Antanaclasis: a related purposeful rhetorical device
 Circumlocution: phrasing to explain something without saying it
 Etymological fallacy: a kind of linguistic misconception
 Evasion (ethics): tell the truth while deceiving
 Fallacy of four terms: an ill form of syllogism
 False equivalence: fallacy based on flawed reasoning
 If-by-whiskey: an example
 Mental reservation: a doctrine in moral theology
 Persuasive definition: skewed definition of term
 Plausible deniability: a blame shifting technique
 Polysemy: the property of word or phrase having certain type of multiple meanings
 Principle of explosion: one of the fundamental laws in logic
 Syntactic ambiguity, Amphiboly, Amphibology: ambiguity of a sentence by its grammatical structure
 When a white horse is not a horse: an example

References

Verbal fallacies
Ambiguity